This is a list of notable events relating to the environment in 1999. They relate to environmental law, conservation, environmentalism and environmental issues.

Events
The GEO-2000 is published. It is part of the Global Environment Outlook project.
The Dioxin Affair, primarily a political crisis, occurred in Belgium during the spring of 1999 due to contamination of feedstock with polychlorinated biphenyls (PCBs). It was detected in animal food products, mainly eggs and chickens.

July
The Environment Protection and Biodiversity Conservation Act 1999 is passed in Australia. It provides a framework for protection of the Australian environment, including its biodiversity and its natural and culturally significant places.
The Memorandum of Understanding concerning Conservation Measures for Marine Turtles of the Atlantic Coast of Africa comes into force.

December
The MV Erika sank off the coast of France creating a major oil spill.

See also

Human impact on the environment